Kalpana Verma is an Indian politician who is serving as Member of 15th Madhya Pradesh Assembly from Raigaon Assembly constituency.

Personal life 
She was born in 19 October 1989.

References 

1989 births
Living people
Madhya Pradesh MLAs 2018–2023